Cheshmeh-ye Cheragh Ali (also Romanized as Cheshmeh-ye Cherāgh ‘Alī) is a village in Robat Rural District, in the Central District of Khorramabad County, Lorestan Province, Iran. At the 2006 census, its population was 41, in 8 families.

References 

Towns and villages in Khorramabad County